West Peavine is a census-designated place (CDP) in Adair County, Oklahoma, United States. The population was 218 at the 2010 census.

Geography
West Peavine is located at  (35.909233, -94.649390).

Demographics

As of the census of 2000, there were 225 people, 94 households, and 70 families residing in the CDP. The population density was 29.0 people per square mile (11.2/km2). There were 98 housing units at an average density of 12.6/sq mi (4.9/km2). The racial makeup of the CDP was 47.56% White, 40.00% Native American, and 12.44% from two or more races. Hispanic or Latino of any race were 1.78% of the population.

There were 94 households, out of which 28.7% had children under the age of 18 living with them, 60.6% were married couples living together, 9.6% had a female householder with no husband present, and 25.5% were non-families. 24.5% of all households were made up of individuals, and 10.6% had someone living alone who was 65 years of age or older. The average household size was 2.39 and the average family size was 2.79.

In the CDP, the population was spread out, with 21.8% under the age of 18, 11.1% from 18 to 24, 23.6% from 25 to 44, 28.4% from 45 to 64, and 15.1% who were 65 years of age or older. The median age was 38 years. For every 100 females, there were 116.3 males. For every 100 females age 18 and over, there were 114.6 males.

The median income for a household in the CDP was $18,750, and the median income for a family was $18,333. Males had a median income of $21,607 versus $31,667 for females. The per capita income for the CDP was $13,219. About 26.9% of families and 26.4% of the population were below the poverty line, including 29.3% of those under the age of eighteen and 8.3% of those 65 or over.

References

Census-designated places in Adair County, Oklahoma
Census-designated places in Oklahoma